Brunton is a surname. Notable people with the surname include:

 Alan Brunton (1946–2002), New Zealand poet
 Alexander Brunton (1772–1854), Scottish minister in the Church of Scotland
 Anna Ross Brunton (born 1773), English actress and dramatist
 Barbara Brunton (1927–2014), Australian stage and radio actress
 C. Brunton (Norfolk cricketer)
 Colin Brunton (born 1955), Canadian film director
 Dianne Brunton, New Zealand ecologist
 Dorothy Brunton (1890–1977), Australian singer and actress
 Elizabeth Brunton (1799–1860), English actress
 Elizabeth York Brunton (1880–), Scottish artist
 Gordon Brunton (1921–2017), English businessman
 Guy Brunton (1878–1948), English archaeologist and Egyptologist
 Kira Brunton (born 1999), Canadian curler
 James Brunton, contemporary Canadian judge
 John Brunton (cricketer) (1869–1962), English cricketer
 John Brunton (manufacturer) (1837–1917), Scottish businessman
 John Brunton (scenic artist) (1849–1909), in Britain and Australia
 Joseph Brunton (1902–1988), American Boy Scout leader
 Lauder Brunton (1844–1916), Scottish physician and first of the Brunton baronets
 Louis Brunton (1891–1934), New Zealand cricketer
 Louisa Brunton (1785?–1860), English actress
 Mary Brunton (1778–1818), Scottish novelist
 Matt Brunton (1878–1962), English soccer player
 Neil Brunton (born 1969), Australian rules footballer
 Paul Brunton (1898–1981), British philosopher and mystic
 Paul Brunton (politician) (born 1944), American politician
 Renita Brunton, suspected murder victim of Peter Dupas
 Richard Henry Brunton (1841–1901), Scottish lighthouse builder active in Japan
 Richard Brunton (artist) (1832), British-American artist and counterfeiter
 Robbie Brunton (1973–2020), Irish soccer player
 Ron Brunton (born 1945), Australian anthropologist
 Samuel Brunton (born 1990), Cook Islands rugby league player
 Violet Brunton (1878–1951), English artist
 William Brunton (1777–1851), Scottish engineer and inventor
 William Brunton (mayor) (1867–1938), of Melbourne, Australia
 Winifred Brunton (1880–1959), South African painter

See also
Brunton baronets

Surnames
English-language surnames
Surnames of English origin
Surnames of British Isles origin